Crown Bioscience International, also known as CrownBio, is a contract research organization focused on patient derived xenografts used in drug screening. The company was acquired by JSR Corporation in January 2018.

Company profile
CrownBio was founded in 2006 as a drug-testing platform centered around xenografts. The company keeps a library of cancer models used for drug-testing that precedes clinical trials. The company applied for listing on the Taipei Exchange in 2016 as part of its integration into Asian markets, and continued to expand its operations from higher revenues.

In 2018, CrownBio merged with JSR Corporation as part of JSR Corporation's expansion into the therapeutic market.

Products
CrownBio's signature products include a library of xenograft models used for drug testing and contract research services for experimental drug screening. The company has at least 8,000 viable human tumors that can be used for the evaluation of drugs used in oncology studies.

References

Biotechnology companies of the United States